This page presents the results of men's and women's volleyball tournaments during the Los Angeles Olympics in the summer of 1984. The competition was held in the Long Beach Arena, which had a capacity of 12,033.

Medal table

Medal summary

Highlights
 The United States won their first men's title Brazil took second. It was Karch Kiraly's first Olympic Gold medal.
 China won the women's title. The United States took second.
 The China National Women's Volleyball National Team completed the three-peat (winners in the World Cup 1981, World Volleyball Championships 1982 and Los Angeles Olympic Games 1984).

See also
 Volleyball at the Friendship Games

References

 
1984
O
1984 Summer Olympics events
International volleyball competitions hosted by the United States
Volleyball in California